The Archbishop of Armagh is the title of the presiding ecclesiastical figure of each of the Roman Catholic Church and the Church of Ireland in the region around Armagh in Northern Ireland. The two posts descend from a common origin, and have similar territories, but they are distinct - please see the specific articles for more:

 Archbishop of Armagh – an article which lists of pre- and post-Reformation archbishops.
Archbishop of Armagh (Roman Catholic)
Archbishop of Armagh (Church of Ireland)

See also
Primate of All Ireland, a title held by each of the above Archbishops by virtue of their office
Primate of Ireland